The Altay–Fuyun–Zhundong railway is a single-track passenger and freight railway in China.

At Zhundong, the line meets the Ürümqi–Dzungaria railway. At Altay, it meets the Kuytun–Beitun railway.

History
Construction of the railway began in August 2016. The section from Fuyun to Zhundong North opened on 30 December 2019. The remaining  section from Altay to Fuyun opened on 6 December 2020.

References

Railway lines in China
Railway lines opened in 2019